Iben Marie Akerlie (born March 5, 1988) is a Norwegian actress and writer. She is best known for her roles in the TV series Mammon (since 2016) and her titular role in Victoria (2013). She has also authored a children's literature novel titled  Lars er LOL (2016).

References 

1988 births
Living people
Norwegian actresses
Norwegian writers